2000–01 Bosnia and Herzegovina Football Cup was the seventh season of the Bosnia and Herzegovina's annual football cup, and a first season of the unified competition. The competition started on 2 December 2000 with the First Round and concluded on 15 June 2001 with the Final.

First round
Thirty-two teams entered in the First Round. The matches were played on 2 December 2000.

|}

Second round
The 16 winners from the prior round enter this round. The first legs were played on 6 December and the second legs were played on 9 December 2000.
 

|}

Intermediate round
On January 31, it was announced that 4 clubs from Srpska will join 8 clubs from the NSBIH to play off for a unified cup. 

The first legs were played on 14 March and the second legs were played on 28 March 2001.

|}

Quarterfinals
The eight winners from the prior round enter this round. The first legs were played on 4 April and the second legs were played on 25 April 2001.

|}

Semifinals
The four winners from the prior round enter this round. The first legs will be played on 9 May and the second legs were played on 25 May 2001.

|}

Final

See also
 2000–01 Premier League of Bosnia and Herzegovina

External links
Statistics on RSSSF

Bosnia and Herzegovina Football Cup seasons
Cup
Bosnia